Streptomyces violaceoruber is a bacterium species from the genus of Streptomyces. Streptomyces violaceoruber produces protoactinorhodin, kendomycin, phospholipase A2, granaticin and methylenomycin A.

Further reading

See also 
 List of Streptomyces species

References 

violaceoruber
Bacteria described in 1970